The 2018–19 U.S. Virgin Islands Premier League was the first season of the U.S. Virgin Islands Premier League, and the 15th season of the U.S. Virgin Islands Soccer Championship, the top division soccer competition in the United States Virgin Islands. The season began on 14 October 2018 and ended on 17 February 2019.

Teams
For the first time, teams from the two main islands, Saint Croix and Saint Thomas, competed together in the same league (previously, they played in their own leagues in St. Croix and St. Thomas respectively before the top teams of the two leagues advanced to the playoffs). A total of eight teams, with four teams from each island, competed in the regular season.

Teams from Saint Croix:
Helenites
Prankton United
Rovers FC
Unique

Teams from Saint Thomas:
LRVI FC
New Vibes
Raymix
United We Stand

Teams played those of same island twice and of other island once in the regular season. The top four teams, regardless of island, advanced to the playoffs.

Regular season

Playoffs

Helenites, who play at the 1,000-capacity Grove Place Park, won championship qualified for Caribbean Club Shield.

References

U.S. Virgin Islands Championship seasons
United States Virgin Islands
2018–19 in United States Virgin Islands soccer